Telomerase RNA component, also known as TR, TER or TERC, is an ncRNA found in eukaryotes that is a component of telomerase, the enzyme used to extend telomeres. TERC serves as a template for telomere replication (reverse transcription) by telomerase.  Telomerase RNAs differ greatly in sequence and structure between vertebrates, ciliates and yeasts, but they share a 5' pseudoknot structure close to the template sequence. The vertebrate telomerase RNAs have a 3' H/ACA snoRNA-like domain.

Structure 
TERC is a Long non-coding RNA (lncRNA) ranging in length from ~150nt in ciliates to 400-600nt in vertebrates, and 1,300nt in yeast (Alnafakh). Mature human TERC (hTR) is 451nt in length. TERC has extensive secondary structural features over 4 principal conserved domains. The core domain, the largest domain at the 5’ end of TERC, contains the CUAAC Telomere template sequence. Its secondary structure consists of a large loop containing the template sequence, a P1 loop-closing helix, and a P2/P3 pseudoknot. The core domain and CR4/CR5 conserved domain associate with TERT, and are the only domains of TERC necessary for in vitro catalytic activity of telomerase. The 3’ end of TERC consists of a conserved H/ACA domain, a 2 hairpin structure connected by a single-stranded hinge and bordered on the 3’ end by a single-stranded ACA sequence. The H/ACA domain binds Dyskerin, GAR1, NOP10, NHP2, to form an H/ACA RNP complex. The conserved CR7 domain is also localized at the 3’ end of TERC, and contains a 3nt CAB (Cajal body Localisation) box which binds TCAB1.

Function 
Telomerase is a ribonucleoprotein polymerase that maintains telomere ends by addition of the telomere repeat TTAGGG. This repeat does vary across eukaryotes (see the table on the telomere article for a complete list). The enzyme consists of a protein component (TERT) with reverse transcriptase activity, and an RNA component, encoded by this gene, that serves as a template for the telomere repeat. CCCUAA found near position 50 of the vertebrate TERC sequence acts as the template. Telomerase expression plays a role in cellular senescence, as it is normally repressed in postnatal somatic cells resulting in progressive shortening of telomeres. Deregulation of telomerase expression in somatic cells may be involved in oncogenesis. Studies in mice suggest that telomerase also participates in chromosomal repair, since de novo synthesis of telomere repeats may occur at double-stranded breaks. Homologs of TERC can also be found in the Gallid herpes viruses.

The core domain of TERC contains the RNA template from which TERT synthesizes TTAGGG telomeric repeats. Unlike in other RNPs, in telomerase, the protein TERT is catalytic while the lncRNA TERC is structural, rather than acting as a ribozyme. The core region of TERC and TERT are sufficient to reconstitute catalytic telomerase activity in vitro. The H/ACA domain of TERC recruits the Dyskerin complex (DKC1, GAR1, NOP10, NHP2), which stabilises TERC, increasing telomerase complex formation and overall catalytic activity. The CR7 domain binds TCAB1, which localizes telomerase to cajal bodies, further increasing telomerase catalytic activity. TERC is ubiquitously expressed, even in cells lacking telomerase activity and TERT expression. As a result, various TERT-independent functional roles of TERC have been proposed. 14 genes containing a TERC binding motif are directly transcriptionally regulated by TERC through RNA-DNA triplex formation-mediated increase of expression. TERC-mediated upregulation of Lin37, Trpg1l, tyrobp, Usp16 stimulates the NF-κB pathway, resulting in increased expression and secretion of inflammatory cytokines.

Biosynthesis 

Unlike most lncRNAs which are assembled from introns by the spliceosome, hTR is directly transcribed from a dedicated promoter site located at genomic locus 3q26.2 by RNA polymerase II. Mature hTR is 451nt in length, but approximately 1/3 of cellular hTR transcripts at steady state have ~10nt genomically encoded 3’ tails. The majority of those extended hTR species have additional oligo-A 3’ extension. Processing of immature 3’-tailed hTR to mature 451nt hTR can be accomplished by direct 3’-5’ exoribonucleolytic degradation or by an indirect pathway of oligoadenylation by PAPD5, removal of 3’ oligo-A tail by the 3’-5’ RNA exonuclease PARN, and subsequent 3’-5’ exoribonucleolytic degradation. Extended hTR transcripts are also degraded by the RNA exosome. 

The 5’ ends of hTR transcripts are also additionally processed. TGS-1 hypermethylation the 5'-methylguanosine cap to an N2,2,7 trimethylguanosine (TMG) cap, which inhibits hTR maturation. Binding of the Dyskerin complex to transcribed H/ACA domains of hTR during transcription promotes termination of transcription. Control of the relative rates of these various competing pathways that activate or inhibit hTR maturation is a crucial element of regulation of overall telomerase activity.

Clinical Significance 

Loss of function mutations in the TERC genomic locus have been associated with a variety of degenerative diseases. Mutations in TERC have been associated with dyskeratosis congenita, idiopathic pulmonary fibrosis, aplastic anemia, and myelodysplasia. Overexpression and improper regulation of TERC have been associated with a variety of cancers. Upregulation of hTR is widely observed in patients with precancerous cervical phenotype as a result of HPV infection. Overexpression of TERC enhances MDV-mediated oncogenesis, and is observed in gastric carcinoma. Overexpression of TERC is also observed in inflammatory conditions such as Type II diabetes and multiple sclerosis, due to TERC-mediated activation of the NF-κB inflammatory pathway.

TERC has been implicated as protective in osteoporosis, with its increased expression arresting the rate of osteogenesis. Due to its overexpression in a range of cancer phenotypes, TERC has been investigated as a potential cancer biomarker. It was found to be an effective biomarker of lung squamous cell carcinoma (LUSC).

References

Further reading

External links 
  GeneReviews/NCBI/NIH/UW entry on Dyskeratosis Congenita
  GeneReviews/NCBI/NIH/UW entry on Pulmonary Fibrosis, Familial
 EntrezGene page for TERC
 
 
 

Non-coding RNA
Telomere-related genes